The Boeing T50 (company designation Model 502) was a small turboshaft engine produced by Boeing. Based on Boeing's earlier Model 500 gas generator, the T50's main application was in the QH-50 DASH helicopter drone of the 1950s. An up-rated version designated Model 550 was developed to power the QH-50D and was given the military designation T50-BO-12.

Variants
T50-BO-1
T50-BO-2
T50-BO-4 at 6,000 output rpm, military rating turboprop.
T50-BO-6
T50-BO-8 at 5,950 output rpm, revised reduction gear ratio, fuelsystem and other changes.
T50-BO-8A
T50-BO-10 at 6,000 output rpm
T50-BO-12
502-1-1Auiliary power unit
502-2ETurboprop,  at 2,900 output rpm max. continuous at sea level.
502-7BCompressed air generator.
502-8ATurboshaft.
502-8BTurboprop,  at 37,500 compressor rpm for take-off.
502-10BTurboprop,  at 37,500 compressor rpm for take-off.
502-10CTurboshaft power unit / gas producer
502-10F
502-10V (T50-BO-4)
502-10VB  at 3,000 output rpm, variant of -10V / T50-B0-4 with revised reduction gear ratio.
502-10VC (T50-BO-8)
502-11Compressed air generator.
502-11B
502-12B
502-W
502-14 (T50-BO-10)
550-1 (T50-BO-12)

Applications
T50 (Model 502)
 Gyrodyne QH-50 DASH
 Kaman K-225
 Kaman HTK-1
 Kaman K-1125
 XL-19B Bird Dog
 Radioplane RP-77D

GT502
 Stridsvagn 103

Specifications (T50-BO-10 / 502-14)

See also
Rover 1S60

References

Notes

Bibliography

External links

 Boeing Model 502 Gas Turbine Engine
  "Jet Sheds Weigh" , September 1947, Popular Science article at bottom of page on earlier Model 500

1950s turboshaft engines